Jeṭh (Punjabi: ਜੇਠ) is a third month of the Nanakshahi calendar, which govern the activities within Sikhism. This month coincides with Jyeshtha in the Hindu calendar and the Indian national calendar, and May and June in the Gregorian and Julian calendars and is 31 days long.

Important events during this month

May
May 15 (1 Jeth) - The start of the month Jeth
May 23 (9 Jeth) - Birth of Guru Amar Das

June
June 11 (28 Jeth) - Gur Gadi of Guru Har Gobind
June 15 (1 Harh) - The end of the month Jeth and the start of Harh

See also
Punjabi calendar

External links
www.srigranth.org SGGS Page 133
www.sikhcoalition.org

Months of the Nanakshahi calendar
Sikh terminology